The Ecole Mondiale World School is located in Gulmohur Cross Road No.9 J.V.P.D. Scheme, Juhu, Mumbai India. Established in 2004, the school provides Play School, Early Years Program, Primary Years Program, Middle Years Program, Diploma Program, and IGCSE education in English medium. The school is situated 4 km from Chhatrapati Shivaji International Airport and about 25 km from the Gateway of India so that students can feel comfortable while coming to school. School is rated 3.1 based on the Rating and Reviews available on SchoolMyKids.com.

The School has also been authorized to offer the International General Certificate for Secondary Education (IGCSE) from the University of Cambridge International Examinations Syndicate.

See also 
 List of schools in Mumbai

References

External links 

Cambridge schools in India
Private schools in Mumbai
International schools in Mumbai
Educational institutions established in 2004
2004 establishments in Maharashtra